Kishor Dhansing Patil is an Indian politician and member of Maharashtra Legislative Assembly from Pachora Vidhansabha Constituency, Jalgaon.

Professional and political career
Kishor Patil started his professional career as cadet in the police department and as an agriculturist.
At the age of 31, Patil contested (and was elected at) his first election to the Pachora Municipal corporation as a President from the Pachora Municipal constituency. Patil was first publicly elected President of Pachora Municipal Council in 2001. He acts as Vice-Chairman of Jalgaon District Shivsena.

Positions held
 2014: Elected to Maharashtra Legislative Assembly
 2015: Elected as Director of Jalgaon District Central Co-operative Bank 
 2015: Elected as Vice President of Jalgaon District Central Co-operative Bank 
 2019: Re-Elected to Maharashtra Legislative Assembly
 2021: Re-Elected as Director of Jalgaon District Central Co-operative Bank

See also
 Pachora
 Pachora Junction
 Pachora Municipal Council
 Jalgaon Lok Sabha constituency

References

External links
  Shivsena Home Page 
Pachora Vidhansabha Constituency
"Kishor Patil Elected from Pachora Constituency" - article retrieved 12 February 2015

Members of the Maharashtra Legislative Council
Maharashtra MLAs 2014–2019
People from Jalgaon district
Marathi politicians
Shiv Sena politicians
Living people
1970 births